The year 1879 in archaeology involved some significant events.

Explorations

Excavations
 Major excavation at Babylon, conducted by Hormuzd Rassam on behalf of the British Museum. Work continues until 1882.
 Excavation of the group tomb of the Sacred Band of Thebes who fell in the Battle of Chaeronea (338 BC) in Boeotia by Panagiotis Stamatakis.
 Excavation of the stone circles of Junapani by J. H. Rivett-Carnac in Maharashtra.

Finds
 April 12: Burial of a Thracian chieftain at Dalboki in central Bulgaria.
 Paintings of bison on the ceiling of the Cave of Altamira in Spain. c.12000 BC; accepted as authentic in 1902.
 Bronze Age weapons hoard at New Bradwell, Buckinghamshire, England.

Publications

Events
 May 10: Establishment of the Archaeological Institute of America.
 Establishment of the Bureau of Ethnology.
Percy Gardner is elected to the Disney Professorship of Archaeology in the University of Cambridge.

Births
 March 29 - Alan Gardiner, English Egyptologist (died 1963).
 July 13 - Alan Wace, English Classical archaeologist (died 1957).
 September 13 - Harry Burton, English archaeological photographer, known for his photos of the excavation of Tutankhamun's tomb (died 1940).
 Grace Mary Crowfoot, née Hood, English textile archaeologist (died 1957).

Deaths

See also
 Cave art / Bison

References

Archaeology
Archaeology by year
Archaeology
Archaeology